Issahaku "Leftey" Yakubu  (born 17 June 1994) is a Ghanaian professional footballer, who plays as a defender for Egyptian Premier League club Wadi Degla.

Club career 
Yakubu began his career at the JMG Academy in Ghana and moved to the youth squad of Belgian Pro League side Lierse in 2014. He was promoted to the senior squad in July 2015 and played for Lierse in the Belgian Second Division until May 2018, when the club went bankrupt.

In the summer of 2018, Yakubu signed a two-year contract with Greek Football League club Ergotelis. He scored his first goal ever in his fourth cap with the club, during a 2–1 Away win vs. fellow Cretan club AO Chania Kissamikos. His performances with Ergotelis impressed club owner Maged Samy, who arranged for Yakubu's transfer to his Egyptian Premier League side Wadi Degla in the winter of 2019.

Career statistics

External links

References

1994 births
Living people
Ghanaian footballers
Ghanaian expatriate footballers
Ghanaian expatriate sportspeople in Belgium
Ghanaian expatriate sportspeople in Greece
Lierse S.K. players
Ergotelis F.C. players
Challenger Pro League players
Expatriate footballers in Belgium
Expatriate footballers in Greece
Association football defenders